Club Deportivo Vaca Díez is a Bolivian football club based in Cobija, Pando. The club was founded on 19 March 1952, and compete in the Primera División, holding home matches at the Estadio Roberto Jordán Cuéllar, with a capacity of 25,000 people.

History
Founded on 19 March 1952, Vaca Díez played for the first time in a national competition in 2005, after winning their regional league championship in Pando and subsequently qualifying to the Copa Simón Bolívar. The club played in that category in a further seven times, reaching the final in 2022.

On 24 November 2022, Vaca Díez achieved their first-ever promotion to the Primera División, after defeating Libertad Gran Mamoré on penalties.

Honours
Copa Simón Bolívar: 2022

Managers
 Jehanamed Castedo (2011)
 Yonny Nay (2011)
 Denis Aramayo (2013)
 Yonny Nay (2019)
 Wilson Escalante (2020)
 Aristóteles Ramos (2021)
 Carlos Hurtado (2022)
 José Aurelio Gay (2023–)

References

Football clubs in Bolivia
Association football clubs established in 1952
1952 establishments in Bolivia